Long Valley  is an unincorporated community and census-designated place (CDP) located within Washington Township, in Morris County, New Jersey, United States. Once known as German Valley from its foundation during the colonial era, the community was renamed in response to anti-German sentiment during World War I. As of the 2010 United States Census, the CDP's population was 1,879.

History
In 1705, a number of German Reformed, residing between Wolfenbüttel and Halberstadt, fled to Neuwied, a town of Rhenish Prussia, where they remained for two years before proceeding on to Holland. In 1707, they embarked for the British colony of New York. Before arriving, their ship was blown off-course to the south, where they were carried into the Delaware Bay and landed in Philadelphia. From there, they embarked by land eastward to what became known as the "German Valley" in what was then called "Nova Caesaria" (New Jersey), located in today's Morris County, New Jersey.

Geography
According to the United States Census Bureau, the CDP had a total area of 4.623 square miles (11.974 km2), including 4.566 square miles (11.825 km2) of land and 0.057 square miles (0.148 km2) of water (1.24%).

There are several bodies of water, including several man-made lakes used for agriculture and a portion of the Raritan River that are not reflected in the calculation of water area.

The climate in this area is characterized by four distinct seasons and large seasonal temperature differences, with warm to hot (and often humid) summers and cold (sometimes severely cold in the northern areas) winters.  According to the Köppen Climate Classification system, Long Valley has a humid continental climate, abbreviated "Dfa" on climate maps.

Demographics

Census 2020

The 2020 United States Census had counted 2201 residents living in Long Valley. In the town there is and estimated 752 houses with 603 builds occupied by owners. The racial make up was 93.3% (2,054) White, 3.9% (85) Black or African American, 2% (44) Native American, 9.1% (200) Asian, 0.00% (0) Pacific Islander, 8% (8) from other races, and 6.6% (146) from two or more races. Hispanic or Latino of any race were 15.3% (337) of the population.

In Long Valley median age is 38.2 years old. 12.5 % (275)of the population is under the age of five. 67.2% (1479) of the population is between the ages of 18 and 64 and 11.4% (447) of the population are 65 or older.  50.5% of the population was male, 49.5% of the population is female.

The median income for a household in Long Valley is $104,722. The median income for males in Long Valley is $96,369, while the median income for females is $80,417. 

Of the population, 21.1% have some form of a high school degree. 17.4% have some college but no degree. 9.5% have an associate's degree. 26% have a bachelor's degree and 20.9% have a graduate or professional degree.

Census 2010

Census 2000
As of the 2000 United States Census there were 1,818 people, 654 households, and 502 families residing in the CDP. The population density was 148.7/km2 (385.4/mi2). There were 674 housing units at an average density of 55.1/km2 (142.9/mi2). The racial makeup of the CDP was 97.36% White, 0.66% African American, 0.22% Native American, 0.94% Asian, 0.28% from other races, and 0.55% from two or more races. Hispanic or Latino of any race were 1.27% of the population.

There were 654 households, out of which 36.9% had children under the age of 18 living with them, 67.0% were married couples living together, 7.5% had a female householder with no husband present, and 23.1% were non-families. 16.7% of all households were made up of individuals, and 4.0% had someone living alone who was 65 years of age or older. The average household size was 2.75 and the average family size was 3.15.

In the CDP the population was spread out, with 25.3% under the age of 18, 5.1% from 18 to 24, 33.3% from 25 to 44, 27.3% from 45 to 64, and 8.9% who were 65 years of age or older. The median age was 38 years. For every 100 females, there were 101.6 males. For every 100 females age 18 and over, there were 98.8 males.

The median income for a household was $97,763, and the median income for a family was $104,926. Males had a median income of $76,791 versus $41,759 for females. The per capita income was $37,489. About 1.8% of families and 2.3% of the population were below the poverty line, including 2.0% of those under age 18 and 4.0% of those age 65 or over.

Notable people

People who were born in, residents of, or otherwise closely associated with Long Valley include:
 Walt Ader (1913-1982), racecar driver who competed in the 1950 Indianapolis 500.
 Jack Borgenicht (1911-2005), mountain climber, entrepreneur, preservationist and philanthropist.
 Michael Burton (born 1992), professional football fullback for the Kansas City Chiefs of the National Football League.
 The Dolan Twins (born 1999) Youtubers.
 Guy R. Gregg (born 1949), politician who served in the New Jersey General Assembly from 1992 to 2008, where he represented the 24th Legislative District.
 Celeste Holm (1917–2012), Oscar-winning actress .
 Jacob W. Miller (1800-1862), politician who served two terms representing New Jersey in the United States Senate.
 Henry Muhlenberg (1711-1787), founder of Lutheranism in America, who established a congregation in German Valley, which met at the Old Stone Church.
 Ida C. Nahm (1865-1922), medical doctor and clubwoman.
 Mike Rossi (freestyle skier) (born 1994), freestyle aerialist.
 Carley Shimkus (born 1986), news anchor and reporter who serves as a co-host on Fox Nation and as headlines reporter for Fox & Friends and Fox & Friends First.
 Shannon Sohn (born 1974),television news reporter at WABC-TV Eyewitness News in New York City, where she became the first helicopter reporter to win a national Emmy Award.
 Lisa Unger (born 1970), author of contemporary fiction.
 Diana West (born 1965), lactation consultant and author specializing on the topic of breastfeeding.
 Charles Wuorinen (1938-2020), Pulitzer Prize-winning composer of contemporary classical music.

Historic district

The German Valley Historic District of Long Valley was added to the National Register of Historic Places on July 14, 1983 for its significance in agriculture, education, transportation, industry, and religion.

References

External links

 Washington Township website
 Washington Township Schools website
 West Morris Central High School Website
 Long Valley Village Association website
 Long Valley Life website
  Long Valley Historical Society Website

Census-designated places in Morris County, New Jersey
Palatine German settlement in New Jersey
Washington Township, Morris County, New Jersey